The following events occurred in February 1954:

February 1, 1954 (Monday)

February 2, 1954 (Tuesday)
 President Eisenhower reports detonation of 1st H-bomb (done in 1952)
Born: Christie Brinkley, American actress, model, and entrepreneur, in Monroe, Michigan

February 3, 1954 (Wednesday)
Elizabeth II becomes the first reigning monarch to visit Australia.

February 4, 1954 (Thursday)

February 5, 1954 (Friday)
Born: Guy Novès, former French rugby player and coach (mainly Stade Toulousain) in Toulouse, Occitania Region, France.

February 6, 1954 (Saturday)
Died: Maxwell Bodenheim, American poet and novelist (murdered) (b. 1892)

February 7, 1954 (Sunday)

February 8, 1954 (Monday)
Died: Laurence Trimble, American actor (b. 1885)

February 9, 1954 (Tuesday)
Died: Mabel Paige, American actress (b. 1880)

February 10, 1954 (Wednesday)
After authorizing $385 million over the $400 million already budgeted for military aid to Vietnam, President of the United States Dwight D. Eisenhower warns against his country's intervention in Vietnam.

February 11, 1954 (Thursday)

February 12, 1954 (Friday)
Died: Dziga Vertov, Russian filmmaker (b. 1896)

February 13, 1954 (Saturday)
Born: Donnie Moore, American baseball player (d. 1989)

February 15, 1954 (Monday)

February 16, 1954 (Tuesday)
Born: Iain Banks, Scottish author (d. 2013)

February 17, 1954 (Wednesday)
Born: Brian Houston, New Zealand-Australian pastor, in Auckland

February 18, 1954 (Thursday)
Born: John Travolta, American actor, director and singer, in Englewood, New Jersey

February 19, 1954 (Friday)
1954 transfer of Crimea: The Soviet Politburo of the Soviet Union orders the transfer of the Crimean Oblast from the Russian SFSR to the Ukrainian SSR.
Born: Sócrates, Brazilian footballer (d. 2011)

February 20, 1954 (Saturday)

February 21, 1954 (Sunday)
Died: William K. Howard, American film director (b. 1899)

February 22, 1954 (Monday)

February 23, 1954 (Tuesday)
The first mass vaccination of children against polio begins in Pittsburgh, United States.

February 24, 1954 (Wednesday)

February 25, 1954 (Thursday)
Lt. Col. Gamal Abdel Nasser becomes premier of Egypt.

February 26, 1954 (Friday)
Born: Recep Tayyip Erdoğan, Turkish politician, President of Turkey, in Istanbul

February 27, 1954 (Saturday)

February 28, 1954 (Sunday)

References

1954
1954-02
1954-02